Israel Hershberg (born November 7, 1948) is a figurative painter who lives and works in Jerusalem. Hershberg is the director and founder of the Jerusalem Studio School.

Biography
Israel Hershberg was born on November 7, 1948 in a Displaced Persons camp in Linz, Austria. In 1949, he immigrated to Israel. In 1958 he moved with his parents to the United States where he attended the Brooklyn Museum School, Brooklyn, NY from 1966 to 1968. In 1972 he received a Bachelor of Fine Arts, Pratt Institute, Brooklyn, New York. In 1973 he received his Master of Fine Arts, State University of New York, Albany, New York. From 1973 to 1984 he taught painting and drawing at the Maryland Institute College of Art, and in 1984, he taught at the New York Academy of Art. That year, he moved to Israel with his wife and family.

Artistic career

In 1998, Hershberg founded the Jerusalem Studio School, a private art school in Jerusalem's Talpiot neighborhood that offers intensive training in drawing and painting within the figurative art tradition. It is considered to be the first school established in Israel to teach realist painting based on observation in the tradition of the Old Masters. Hershberg heads the school's “master class” program and is the artistic director of the JSS.

In 2014, Hershberg founded JSS in Civita - Summer Art School and Residency in Italy, a summer art program in Civita Castellana, Italy.

Hershberg believes that for a true painter, "reality is a continual feast, a never-ending delight to the eyes."  He quotes Albert York, who said "I think we live in a Paradise. . . . This is a Garden of Eden."

Hershberg's work is included in private and public collections internationally. Israel Hershberg is represented by the Marlborough Gallery in New York, and lives and works in Jerusalem, Israel.

Awards and recognition 
Hershberg was the recipient of a Ford Foundation scholarship in 1980. He was awarded the Sandberg Prize for Israeli Art in 1991 and the Tel Aviv Museum prize for Israeli Art in 1998.  His work has been purchased by the Israel Museum in Jerusalem, the Tel Aviv Museum of Art, the Jewish Museum in New York City  and the National Gallery of Canada in Ottawa.

Gallery

See also
Visual arts in Israel

References

Further reading
 Schwarz, Arturo.  Love at First Sight, The Israel Museum, Jerusalem, 2001, pp. 75–76, 100.
 Goodman, Susan Tumarkin.  After Rabin – New Art from Israel, exhibition catalog, The Jewish Museum, New York, 1998, pp. 69, 80.
 Green, David.  “Master of the Class,” The Jerusalem Report, February 5, 1998, pp. 42–44.
 Kushner, Anita.  “Confronting the Human Figure”, Haaretz Magazine, March 12, 1999, p. 25.
 Sheffi, Smadar.  “Return to Realism” (“Hazarah l’Realizm”, in Hebrew),  Haaretz, August 3, 1999.
 Hausman, Tamar.  “Getting It All Figured Out”, Haaretz, March 16, 2001.
 Burstein, Dror.  “Turning the Bowl on its Edge”  (“Hofech et HaKearah Al Piha”, in Hebrew), Kol Ha’Ir, Dec. 5, 2003, p. 67.

External links 
 
 
 
 "From Afar" Exhibition at Marlborough Chelsea
 Director's Statement, Jerusalem Studio School
 Israel Hershberg website

Living people
Sandberg Prize recipients
Israeli painters
1948 births